Boner Records is an American independent record label in Berkeley, California, owned by Tom Flynn. It has released recordings by Fang (Flynn's band), Verbal Abuse, MDC, Boneless Ones, Duh, Steel Pole Bath Tub, Melvins, The Warlock Pinchers, Hell's Kitchen, and Superconductor.

Discography

Melvins
Ozma (1989)
Bullhead (1991)
Eggnog (1991)
Lysol (1992)

Buzz Osborne
King Buzzo (1992)

Dale Crover
Dale Crover (1992)

Joe Preston
Joe Preston (1992)

Fang
Landshark (1982) 
Where The Wild Things Are  (1983) 
A Mi Ga Sfafas?  (1987) 
Landshark/Where the Wild Thing Are  (1989)

MDC
Metal Devil Cokes: It's The Real Thing (1989)

Verbal Abuse
Rocks Your Liver (1986)

Fearless Iranians from Hell
 Fearless Iranians from Hell 7" (1986)
 Die for Allah (1987)
 Holy War (1988)
 Foolish Americans (1990)
 Foolish Americans/Holy War/Die for Allah CD (1990)

Hell's Kitchen
If You Can't Take The Heat (1988)

Steel Pole Bath Tub
Butterfly Love (1989)
Lurch (1989)
Tulip (1991) 
The Miracle of Sound in Motion (Boner/Tupelo) (1993)

Milk Cult
Love God (Boner/Tupelo) (1992)

Ed Hall
Albert (1988)
Love Poke Here (1990)

Bomb
Hits of Acid (1988)

Warlock Pinchers
Deadly Kung Fu Action (1989)
Circusized Peanuts (1991)

Star Pimp
Treasure Trail (1992)
Seraphin 28OZ (1993)

See also
 List of record labels

References

Hardcore record labels
Heavy metal record labels
Punk record labels
American independent record labels
Boner Records albums
Companies based in Berkeley, California